Juozas Kudirka (March 13, 1939 - June 21, 2007) was a Lithuanian ethnologist, habilitated doctor of sciences in humanities.

He graduated from Vilnius University in 1965 majoring in history. His diploma work was Veiveriai Teacher's Seminary. In 1969 he earned his kandidat nauk degree in historical sciences after the post-graduate course at the Institute of History of the Lithuanian Academy of Sciences, which was soon promoted to the highest Soviet-time scientific degree of doktor nauk, with the thesis Pottery in Lithuania, which in 1973 was published as a book Lietuvos puodžiai ir puodai (Lithuanian Potters and Pots). In 1995 he earned the dr.hab. degree in ethnology.

His works significantly contributed to the preservation and popularization of folk traditions and  cultural revival of Lithuania. In particular, he was instrumental in the restoration of the calendar of traditional Lithuanian holidays in post-Soviet Lithuania.

Books
Kudirka wrote 23 books, including:
 Lietuvos puodžiai ir puodai (1973)
 Lietuvių liaudies meno šaltiniai (1986)
 Lietuviai: etniniai bruožai (1991)
Translated as The Lithuanians: An Ethnic Portrait, Lithuanian Folk Culture Centre, 1991
Užgavėnės (1992), about the Užgavėnės festival
 Lietuviškos Kūčios ir Kalėdos (1993)
 Lietuvių sportiniai žaidimai (1993)
 Vilniaus verbos (Vilnius Easter Palms), 4 volumes (1993)
Lietuviškoji Veiverių mokytojų seminarija (1996)
 Seven popular books about holidays (Easter, Christmas, Saint Jonas Day, St. George's Day, Mother's Day, Mardi Gras).
Describes traditions of weddings, births and funerals in the two villages with Lithuanian population in Belarus
 Plikių kaimo papročiai (Plikiai Village Customs, 1998).
Detailed descriptions of weddings and smaller descriptions of baptisms and funerals of Lithuanians in a Belarusian village, as well as some archaic custos preserved in the village

Awards
1999:   for his research on ethnic culture in the borderlands. Significant material was collected by J. Kudirka about traditional culture in ethnic Lithuanian lands in Belarus. Part of it was used in publications about calendar holidays.

References

1939 births
2007 deaths
Lithuanian ethnologists